The KwaZulu-Natal Inland women's cricket team, also known as the Hollywoodbets Tuskers, is the women's representative cricket team for part of the South African province of KwaZulu-Natal, based primarily in Pietermaritzburg. They compete in the Women's Provincial Programme and the CSA Women's Provincial T20 Competition.

History
KwaZulu-Natal Inland Women joined the South African domestic structure in the 2006–07 season, playing in the Women's Provincial League, finished 5th in their group with four wins from their twelve matches. They joined a team named KwaZulu-Natal in the league, who were later renamed KwaZulu-Natal Coastal. They have never reached the knockout stages of the one-day provincial competition.

They have also competed in the CSA Women's Provincial T20 Competition since its inception in 2012–13. They have also never reached the knockout stages of this competition.

Players

Current squad
Based on squad announced for the 2021–22 season. Players in bold have international caps.

Notable players
Players who have played for KwaZulu-Natal Inland and played internationally are listed below, in order of first international appearance (given in brackets):

  Trisha Chetty (2007)
  Mary-Anne Musonda (2019)

See also
 KwaZulu-Natal Inland (cricket team)
 KwaZulu-Natal Coastal women's cricket team

References

Women's cricket teams in South Africa
Cricket in KwaZulu-Natal